Mary Gambale (born December 18, 1988) is an American former professional tennis player.

Gambale grew up in Winchester, Massachusetts and was coached by her father Bob. She played Junior Fed Cup tennis for the United States and was later used as a hitting partner for the senior team. After winning the USTA Girls 18s National Championships as a 16-year old in 2005, Gambale received a wildcard into the main draw of that year's US Open, where she was beaten in the first round by Dally Randriantefy.

ITF finals

Singles: 1 (0–1)

Doubles: 1 (1–1)

References

External links
 
 

1988 births
Living people
American female tennis players
Tennis people from Massachusetts
People from Winchester, Massachusetts